The Dunblane massacre took place at Dunblane Primary School in Dunblane, near Stirling, Scotland, on 13 March 1996, when Thomas Hamilton shot dead 16 pupils and one teacher, and injured 15 others, before killing himself. It remains the deadliest mass shooting in British history.

Following the killings, public debate centred on gun control laws, including public petitions for a ban on private ownership of handguns and an official inquiry, which produced the 1996 Cullen Report. 

The incident led to a public campaign, known as the Snowdrop Petition, which helped bring about legislation, specifically two new Firearms Acts, which outlawed the private ownership of most handguns within Great Britain, with few exceptions. The UK Government instituted a temporary gun buyback programme, which provided some compensation to lawful handgun owners.

Since the massacre, and tighter firearm restrictions, no mass shootings with handguns have occurred, though incidents with shotguns and rifles—such as the 2010 Cumbria shootings or the 2021 Plymouth shooting—have taken place; however, as has been consistently the case since the introduction of the Firearms Act 1968, incidents involving lawfully owned firearms in the UK remain extremely rare.

Shooting 
At about 8:15 a.m. on 13 March 1996, Thomas Hamilton, aged 43, was seen scraping ice off his van outside his home at Kent Road in Stirling. Hamilton arrived on the grounds of Dunblane Primary School at around 9:30 a.m. and parked his van near a telegraph pole in the car park of the school. He cut the cables at the bottom of the telegraph pole, which served nearby houses, with a pair of pliers before making his way across the car park towards the school buildings.

Hamilton headed towards the north-west side of the school to a door near the toilets and the school gymnasium. After entering, he made his way to the gymnasium armed with four legally-held handguns—two 9mm Browning HP pistols and two Smith & Wesson M19 .357 Magnum revolvers. Hamilton was also carrying 743 ammunition cartridges. In the gym was a class of 28 Primary 1 pupils preparing for a P.E. lesson in the presence of three adult members of staff.

Before entering the gymnasium, it is believed Hamilton fired two shots into the stage of the assembly hall and the girls' toilet.

Hamilton started shooting rapidly and randomly. He shot P.E. teacher Eileen Harrild, who was injured in her arms and chest as she attempted to protect herself, and continued shooting into the gym. Harrild stumbled into the open-plan store cupboard at the side of the gym along with several injured children. Gwen Mayor, the teacher of the Primary 1 class, was shot and killed instantly. The other adult present, Mary Blake, a supervisory assistant, was shot in the head and both legs but also managed to make her way to the store cupboard with several of the children in front of her.

From entering the gymnasium and walking a few steps, Hamilton had fired 29 shots with one of the pistols, killed one child, and injured several others. Four injured children had taken shelter in the store cupboard along with the injured Harrild and Blake. Hamilton then moved up the east side of the gym, firing six shots as he walked, and then fired eight shots towards the opposite end of the gym. He then went towards the centre of the gym, firing 16 shots at point-blank range at a group of children who had been incapacitated by his earlier shots.

A Primary 7 pupil who was walking along the west side of the gymnasium exterior at the time heard loud bangs and screams and looked inside. Hamilton shot in his direction and the pupil was injured by flying glass before running away. From this position, Hamilton fired 24 shots in various directions. He fired shots towards a window next to the fire exit at the south-east end of the gym, possibly at an adult who was walking across the playground, and then fired four more shots in the same direction after opening the fire exit door. Hamilton then exited the gym briefly through the fire exit, firing another four shots towards the cloakroom of the library, striking and injuring Grace Tweddle, another member of staff at the school.

In the mobile classroom closest to the fire exit where Hamilton was standing, Catherine Gordon saw him firing shots and instructed her Primary 7 class to get down onto the floor before Hamilton fired nine bullets into the classroom, striking books and equipment. One bullet passed through a chair where a child had been sitting seconds before. Hamilton then re-entered the gym, dropped the pistol he was using, and took out one of the two revolvers.

He put the barrel of the gun in his mouth, pointed it upwards, and pulled the trigger, killing himself. A total of 32 people sustained gunshot wounds inflicted by Hamilton over a 3–4 minute period, 16 of whom were fatally wounded in the gymnasium, including Gwen Mayor, the Primary 1 teacher, and 15 of her pupils. One other child died en route to hospital.

The first call to the police was made at 9:41 a.m. by the headmaster of the school, Ronald Taylor, who had been alerted by assistant headmistress Agnes Awlson to the possibility of a gunman on the school premises. Awlson had told Taylor that she had heard screaming inside the gymnasium and had seen what she thought to be cartridges on the ground, and Taylor had been aware of loud noises which he assumed to have been from builders on site that he had not been informed of. As he was on his way to the gym, the shooting ended and when he saw what had happened he ran back to his office and told deputy headmistress Fiona Eadington to call for ambulances, a call which was made at 9:43 a.m.

The first ambulance arrived on the scene at 9:57 a.m. in response to the call made at 9:43 a.m. Another medical team from Dunblane Health Centre arrived at 10:04 a.m. which included doctors and a nurse, who were involved in the initial resuscitation of the injured. Medical teams from the health centres in Doune and Callander arrived shortly after. The accident and emergency department at Stirling Royal Infirmary had also been informed of a major incident involving multiple casualties at 9:48 a.m. and the first of several medical teams from the hospital arrived at 10:15 a.m. Another medical team from the Falkirk and District Royal Infirmary arrived at 10:35 a.m.

By about 11:10 a.m., all of the injured had been taken to Stirling Royal Infirmary for medical treatment; one child died en route to the hospital. Upon examination, several of the patients were transferred to the District Royal Infirmary in Falkirk and some to the Royal Hospital for Sick Children in Glasgow. Future tennis players Andy and Jamie Murray, both pupils at the school during the event, were not injured during the massacre.

Perpetrator 
Thomas Watt Hamilton was born on 10 May 1952 in Glasgow. As the head of several youth clubs, Hamilton had been subject to several complaints to police regarding inappropriate behaviour towards young boys, including claims that he had taken photographs of semi-naked boys without parental consent. He had briefly been a Scout leader – initially, in July 1973, he was appointed assistant leader with the 4th/6th Stirling of the Scout Association. Later that year, he was seconded as leader to the 24th Stirlingshire troop, which was being revived. Several complaints were made about Hamilton's leadership, including complaints about Scouts being forced to sleep in close proximity with him inside his van during hill-walking expeditions. Within months, on 13 May 1974, Hamilton's Scout Warrant was withdrawn, with the County Commissioner stating that he was "suspicious of his moral intentions towards boys". He was blacklisted by the Association and thwarted in a later attempt he made to become a Scout leader in Clackmannanshire.

Hamilton claimed in letters that local rumours regarding his behaviour towards young boys had led to the failure of his business in 1993, and that, in the last months of his life, he had complained that his attempts to organise a boys' club were subjected to persecution by local police and the scout movement. Among those he complained to were Queen Elizabeth II and his local Member of Parliament (MP), Michael Forsyth (Conservative). In the 1980s, another MP, George Robertson (Labour), who lived in Dunblane, had complained to Forsyth about Hamilton's local boys' club, which his son had attended. On the day following the massacre, Robertson spoke of having previously argued with Hamilton "in my own home".

On 19 March 1996, six days after the massacre, Hamilton's body was cremated. According to a police spokesman, this service was conducted "far away from Dunblane".

Subsequent legislation 

The Cullen Reports, the result of the inquiry into the Dunblane massacre, recommended that the Government of the United Kingdom introduce tighter controls on handgun ownership and consider whether an outright ban on private ownership would be in the public interest in the alternative (though club ownership would be maintained). The report also recommended changes in school security and vetting of people working with children under 18. The Home Affairs Select Committee agreed with the need for restrictions on gun ownership but stated that a handgun ban was not appropriate.

An advocacy group, the Gun Control Network, was founded in the aftermath of the massacre and was supported by some parents of the victims of the Dunblane and Hungerford massacres shootings. Bereaved families and others also campaigned for a ban on private gun ownership.

In response to public debate, the Conservative government of Prime Minister John Major introduced the Firearms (Amendment) Act 1997, which banned all cartridge ammunition handguns with the exception of .22 calibre rimfire in England, Scotland and Wales. Following the 1997 United Kingdom general election, the Labour government of Prime Minister Tony Blair introduced the Firearms (Amendment) (No. 2) Act 1997, banning the remaining .22 cartridge handguns as well. This left only muzzle-loading and historic handguns legal, as well as certain sporting handguns (e.g. "Long-Arms") and long-barrelled handguns that fall outside the minimum barrel and overall length dimensions in the Firearms Act 1968, as amended. 

Despite the general perception that handguns are now 'banned in the UK', the ban did not and does not affect Northern Ireland, where it remains perfectly legal for ordinary citizens to own handguns for target shooting (subject to holding a firearms licence) and, in certain circumstance, also self-defence. Northern Ireland is the only part of the UK where handguns can be carried for the purposes of self-defence, and this is subject to the owner holding a personal protection weapon permit. Almost 3000 such permits were on issue as of 2012. 

Evidence of previous police interaction with Hamilton was presented to the Cullen Inquiry but was later sealed under a closure order to prevent publication for 100 years. The official reason for sealing the documents was to protect the identities of children, but this led to accusations of a coverup intended to protect the reputations of officials. Following a review of the closure order by the Lord Advocate, Colin Boyd, edited versions of some of the documents were released to the public in October 2005. Four files containing post-mortems, medical records and profiles on the victims, as well as Hamilton's post-mortem, remained sealed under the 100-year order to avoid distressing the relatives and survivors.

The released documents revealed that in 1991, complaints against Hamilton were made to the Central Scotland Police and were investigated by the Child Protection Unit. He was reported to the Procurator Fiscal for consideration of ten charges, including assault, obstructing police and contravention of the Children and Young Persons Act 1937. No action was taken and he retained his firearms certificate, despite these charges and accusations being lawful reasons for the police to have revoked his firearms certificate prior to the Dunblane tragedy.

Media coverage 
Two books – Dunblane: Our Year of Tears by Peter Samson and Alan Crow and Dunblane: Never Forget by Mick North – both give accounts of the massacre from the perspective of those most directly affected. In 2009, the Sunday Express was criticised for an inappropriate article about the survivors of the massacre, thirteen years after the event.

On the Sunday following the shootings the morning service from Dunblane Cathedral, conducted by Colin MacIntosh, was broadcast live by the BBC. The BBC also had live transmission of the memorial service on 9 October 1996, also held at Dunblane Cathedral. A documentary series, Crimes That Shook Britain, discussed the massacre. The documentary Dunblane: Remembering our Children, which featured many of the parents of the children who had been killed, was broadcast by STV and ITV at the time of the first anniversary. At the time of the tenth anniversary in March 2006 two documentaries were broadcast: Channel 5 screened Dunblane — A Decade On and BBC Scotland showed Remembering Dunblane. On 9 March 2016 relatives of the victims spoke in a BBC Scotland documentary entitled Dunblane: Our Story to mark the twentieth anniversary. A 2018 Netflix documentary, Lessons from a School Shooting: Notes from Dunblane, directed by Kim A. Snyder, drew comparison with the Sandy Hook massacre in the US by exploring the grief and friendship between the two priests serving the affected communities at the times of the respective shootings. On 11 March 2021, ITV aired a special documentary to mark the twenty-fifth anniversary: Return to Dunblane with Lorraine Kelly in which the presenter revisited the town, speaking with the victims' families and emergency aid workers.

Memorials and tributes 

Two days after the shooting, a vigil and prayer session was held at Dunblane Cathedral which was attended by people of all faiths. On Mothering Sunday, on 17 March, Queen Elizabeth II and her daughter Anne, Princess Royal, attended a memorial service at Dunblane Cathedral.

Seven months after the massacre, in October 1996, the families of the victims organised their own memorial service at Dunblane Cathedral, which more than 600 people attended, including Prince Charles. The service was broadcast live on BBC1 and conducted by James Whyte, a former Moderator of the General Assembly of the Church of Scotland. Television presenter Lorraine Kelly, who had befriended some of the victims' families whilst reporting on the massacre for GMTV, was a guest speaker at the service.
 
In August 1997, two varieties of rose were unveiled and planted as the centrepiece for a roundabout in Dunblane. The two roses were developed by Cockers Roses of Aberdeen; the 'Gwen Mayor' rose and 'Innocence' rose, in memory of the children killed. A snowdrop cultivar, originally found in a Dunblane garden in the 1970s, was renamed 'Sophie North' in memory of one of the victims of the massacre.

The gymnasium at the school was demolished on 11 April 1996 and replaced by a memorial garden. Two years after the massacre, on 14 March 1998, a memorial garden was opened at Dunblane Cemetery, where Mayor and twelve of the slain children are buried. The garden features a fountain with a plaque of the names of those killed. Stained glass windows in memory of the victims were placed in three local churches, St Blane's and the Church of the Holy Family in Dunblane and the nearby Lecropt Kirk as well as at the Dunblane Youth and Community Centre.

Newton Primary School awards The Gwen Mayor Rosebowl to a pupil every year. A charity, the Gwen Mayor Trust, was set up by the Educational Institute of Scotland to provide funding for projects in Scottish primary schools.

The National Association of Primary Education commissioned a sculpture, "Flame for Dunblane", created by Walter Bailey from a single yew tree, which was placed in the National Forest, near Moira, Leicestershire.

The nave of Dunblane Cathedral has a standing stone by the monumental sculptor Richard Kindersley. It was commissioned by the Kirk Session as the cathedral's commemoration and dedicated at a service on 12 March 2001. It is a Clashach stone two metres high on a Caithness flagstone base. The quotations on the stone are by E. V. Rieu ("He called a little child to him..."), Richard Henry Stoddard ("...the spirit of a little child"), Bayard Taylor ("But still I dream that somewhere there must be The spirit of a child that waits for me") and W. H. Auden ("We are linked as children in a circle dancing").

With the consent of Bob Dylan, the musician Ted Christopher wrote a new verse for "Knockin' on Heaven's Door" in memory of the Dunblane school children and their teacher. The recording of the revised version of the song, which included brothers and sisters of the victims singing the chorus and Mark Knopfler on guitar, was released on 9 December 1996 in the UK, and reached number 1. The proceeds went to charities for children.

Pipe Major Robert Mathieson of the Shotts and Dykehead Pipe Band composed a pipe tune in tribute, "The Bells of Dunblane".

Scottish composer James MacMillan created a choral work, A child's prayer, as a tribute to the dead at Dunblane.

English punk rock band U.K. Subs released a song called "Dunblane" on their 1997 album "Quintessentials", with the chorus "After Dunblane how can you hold a gun and say you're innocent?"

See also 

 Robert Mone – responsible for a school hostage-taking and shooting in Dundee in 1967
 List of attacks related to primary schools
 List of massacres in Great Britain
 List of school massacres
 List of rampage killers (school massacres)
 Cumbria shootings, mass shooting in England in 2010
 Hungerford massacre, mass shooting in England in 1987

References

Further reading 

 
 Mick North, Dunblane: never forget, (Mainstream, 2000) 
 Pam Rhodes, Coming through: true stories of hope and courage, (Pan, 2002) 
 Peter Samson and Alan Crow, Dunblane: our year of tears, (Mainstream, 1997) 
 Peter Squires, Gun culture or gun control?: firearms, violence and society, (Routledge, 2000) 
 P. Whitbread, "Media Liaison: The Lessons from Dunblane" in Shirley Harrison (ed.), Disasters and the media: managing crisis communications, (Macmillan, 1999) 
 Peter Aylward, 'Understanding Dunblane and Other Massacres'(Routledge, 2012)

External links 
 The transcript of the 1996 Cullen Inquiry into the Dunblane Massacre 
  Prohibition of weapons and ammunition and control of small-calibre pistols
  Prohibition of small calibre pistols
 After Dunblane Gun Control in the UK 1996–2001 (PDF)
 Dunblane papers released
 A Timeline of the Massacre
 Dunblane Massacre – A description on the incident by the Guardian

1996 in Scotland
1996 mass shootings in Europe
1996 murders in the United Kingdom
1990s mass shootings in the United Kingdom
20th-century mass murder in the United Kingdom
Attacks on buildings and structures in 1996
Deaths by firearm in Scotland
Massacre
Dunblane massacre
Elementary school killings
Elementary school shootings
Gun politics in the United Kingdom
History of Stirling (council area)
March 1996 crimes
March 1996 events in the United Kingdom
Mass murder in 1996
Mass murder in Scotland
Mass shootings in Scotland
Massacres in Scotland
Massacres in 1996
Murder–suicides in the United Kingdom
Public inquiries in Scotland
School killings in the United Kingdom
School massacres in Europe
School shootings in the United Kingdom